Wińsko  is a village (former town) in Wołów County, Lower Silesian Voivodeship, in south-western Poland. It is the seat of the administrative district (gmina) called Gmina Wińsko.

The village has a population of 1,600.

External links
 Jewish Community in Wińsko on Virtual Shtetl

References

Villages in Wołów County
Former populated places in Lower Silesian Voivodeship